Glorious may refer to:

Music
 Glorious (music group), a French Christian rock and worship band

Albums
 Glorious (Arty album) or the title song, 2015
 Glorious (Bonfire album), 2015
 Glorious (Foxes album) or the title song (see below), 2014
 Glorious (Gloria Gaynor album), 1977
Glorious: The Singles 97–07, by Natalie Imbruglia, or the title song (see below), 2007
 Glorious (EP), by Ella Henderson, or the title song (see below), 2019

Songs
 "Glorious" (Andreas Johnson song), 1999
 "Glorious" (Cascada song), 2013
 "Glorious" (Foxes song), 2014
 "Glorious" (Ella Henderson song), 2019
 "Glorious" (Macklemore song), 2017
 "Glorious" (Måns Zelmerlöw song), 2016
 "Glorious" (Natalie Imbruglia song), 2007
 "Glorious" (The Pierces song), 2011
 "Glorious", by Adorable from Against Perfection, 1993
 "Glorious", by David Archuleta, theme song from the documentary film Meet the Mormons, 2014; originally by Stephanie Mabey, 2012
 "Glorious", by Everclear from Welcome to the Drama Club, 2006
 "Glorious", by James Morrison from You're Stronger Than You Know, 2019
 "Glorious", by Muse from Black Holes and Revelations, 2006
 "Glorious", by Tkay Maidza, 2017

Other uses
 Glorious (Eddie Izzard), a 1997 stand-up comedy performance video by Eddie Izzard
 Glorious! (stage comedy), a 2005 play by Peter Quilter
 Glorious (film), a 2022 horror film starring J.K. Simmons
 Glorious-class aircraft carrier or Courageous-class, a Royal Navy group of three ships 1925—1945
 HMS Glorious, a battlecruiser converted to aircraft carrier

See also
 
 
 Glorioso (disambiguation)
 Glory (disambiguation)